Body Fever or Super Cool is a 1969 American low-budget crime drama film, directed by Ray Dennis Steckler. It stars Carolyn Brandt as a cat burglar and Bernard Fein as a down and out detective searching for her. Rotten Tomatoes mentions that in the film a "lackadaisical gumshoe is caught between a glamorous thief, a gang of ruthless hoodlums and a handful of vicious drug peddlers in this quirky crime drama".

Steckler created a bit part for then destitute fellow director Coleman Francis.  Francis died just a few years later in 1973.

Cast
Carolyn Brandt as Carrie Erskine
Bernard Fein as Big Mack
Gary Kent as Frankie Roberts
Brett Pearson as Brett
Herb Robins as Herbie
Ray Dennis Steckler as Charles Smith
Coleman Francis as Coley
Dina Bryan as Stella
Julie Conners as Shawn Call
Brett Zeller as Carol Hollister

Reception
Video Watchdog notes that though Steckler's films had displayed a "steady decline" during this period, Body Fever was the exception.

References

External links
 

1969 films
1969 crime drama films
American crime drama films
1960s American films